Agostino da Bagnoregio (died 1459) was a Roman Catholic prelate who served as Bishop of Bagnoregio (1449–1459).

Biography
Agostino da Bagnoregio was appointed a priest in the Order of Saint Augustine. On 26 September 1445, he was appointed by Pope Eugene IV as Bishop of Bagnoregio. He served as Bishop of Bagnoregio until his death in 1446.

References

External links and additional sources
 (for Chronology of Bishops) 
 (for Chronology of Bishops) 

15th-century Italian Roman Catholic bishops
1459 deaths
Bishops appointed by Pope Eugene IV
Augustinian bishops